Monster Family 2 (also known as Monster Family 2: Nobody's Perfect and released as Happy Family 2 in Germany) is a 2021 German-British computer animated horror comedy film directed and produced by Holger Tappe and written by David Safier. A sequel to the 2017 film Monster Family, the voice cast includes Emily Watson, Jason Isaacs, Nick Frost, Jessica Brown Findlay, Catherine Tate, Ethan Rouse (who all reprise their roles) and Emily Carey. The film was released direct-to-video in the UK as a Sky Cinema Original Film by the Sky Group on 22 October 2021, and was released in US cinemas by VivaKids on 15 October.

Plot

A year after the previous events, the Wishbone family is struggling with its various shortcomings. Son Max is the shortest student in the 8th grade. All the classmates are at least a head taller, so they laugh at the clumsy fat man with glasses. His sister Faye is believes that all her friends are talented in something, but she is not. The mother Emma tries to help her children, but her advice is ignored at best and often irritates them. Finally, the father Frank's happiness at his new job and calmer lifestyle is being ruined because his family is so unhappy.

At the wedding of the witch Baba Yaga and the hunchbacked butler of Renfield (who have become part of the large Wishbone family as surrogate grandparents), the bride and groom are kidnapped shortly before they exchange oaths. The kidnapper is Mila Starr, the only daughter of a billionaire, scientific genius and philanthropist, couple Marlene and Maddox Starr. To save Baba Yaga and Renfield, Max intentionally uses Baba Yaga's magic to turn himself and his family into their monster forms again.

Voice cast
 Emily Watson as Emma Wishbone, the matriarch of the Wishbone family who is turned into a vampire again.
 Nick Frost as Frank Wishbone, the patriarch of the Wishbone family who is turned into Frankenstein's monster again.
 Jessica Brown Findlay as Fay Wishbone, the daughter of Emma and Frank who is turned into a mummy again.
 Ethan Rouse as Max Wishbone, the son of Emma and Frank who is turned into a werewolf again.
 Catherine Tate as Baba Yaga, a witch who is now friends with the Wishbone family.
 Jason Isaacs as Dracula A.I., the A.I. of the jet that the Wishbone family uses.
 Emily Carey as:
 Mila Starr, an expert monster hunter.
 Mila 2.0
 Rebecca Camp as Girl #1
 Daniel Ben Zenou as Maddox Starr, a billionaire philanthropist who is the father of Mila.
 Emma Tate as:
 Marlene Starr, a billionaire philanthropist who is the mother of Mila.
 Girl #2
 Female News Presenter
 Ewan Bailey as:
 Renfield, a hunchback and Baba Yaga's fiancé.
 Reverend
 Fisherman
 Male News Presenter
 Farmer
 Matt Roberts as Protester
 Oliver Kalfkofe as Yeti
 Tilo Schmitz as King Konga

Release
"Monster Family 2" was released on October 15, 2021 by VivaKids in the United States, and then on October 22, 2021 as a Sky Cinema original by Sky in the United Kingdom. It was later released on Blu-ray and DVD on February 7, 2022 as a 2-movie collection with the original film "Monster Family" by Universal Pictures Home Entertainment (through Warner Bros. Home Entertainment).

Reception
Tom Cassidy of Common Sense Media gave Monster Family 2 a negative review, calling it "frightfully bad" and "a hollow experience". A review in Stuff.co.nz described the film as "a pallid, insipid sequel that will struggle to entertain even the most undemanding primary schooler". Pablo De Vita of La Nación offered a more positive review, stating that the movie was entertaining, albeit derivative.

References

External links
 
 

2020s fantasy comedy films
2020s monster movies
2021 animated films
2021 comedy films
2021 comedy horror films
2021 computer-animated films
2021 films
3D animated films
Animated films about families
Animated films based on Slavic mythology
Animated films set in New York City
Baba Yaga
British computer-animated films
British vampire films
British werewolf films
English-language German films
Films about dysfunctional families
Films about witchcraft
Films impacted by the COVID-19 pandemic
British films set in New York City
Frankenstein films
German computer-animated films
Mummy films
Vampire comedy films
Vampires in animated film
Werewolves in animated film
2020s English-language films
2020s British films